The Air New Zealand Shell Open was a golf tournament held in New Zealand between 1975 and 1994. The event was the New Zealand Airlines Classic in 1975 and 1976 and the New Zealand Airlines Open in 1977. The Grange hosted the first and final editions of the event but Titirangi hosted the event the most, 14 times between 1977 - 1991. The only other courses to host the event were Russley (1976) and Wellington (1979).

History
In 1975, the event was formed and hosted by Air New Zealand. In 1977, the event became part of the PGA Tour of Australia's Order of Merit. The following year Shell Oil also became a title sponsor.

The 1979 event coincided with the Mount Erebus disaster. On November 28, the day before the tournament began, Air New Zealand Flight 901 crashed into Mount Erebus in Antarctica. There was much discussion about cancelling the tournament. However, Morrie Davis (CEO of Air New Zealand) decided that the tournament would go on. Australian David Graham won the event.

Winners

Notes

References

Former PGA Tour of Australasia events
Golf tournaments in New Zealand
Recurring sporting events established in 1975
Recurring events disestablished in 1994
1975 establishments in New Zealand
1994 disestablishments in New Zealand